Joseph Aloysius Burke may refer to:

Joseph A. Burke (1886–1962), American Catholic Bishop 
Joe Burke (composer) (1884–1950), American composer
Joe Burke (infielder) (1867–1940), American baseball player